Scriptorium Fonts is an Austin, Texas based type foundry founded in 1992 by game designer, editor and historian Dave Nalle. This type foundry currently has three other type designers on staff: Michael Scarpitti, Peter Nevins and Kevin Andrew Murphy.

In 2005, Scriptorium Fonts raised money for Hurricane Katrina relief by selling three New Orleans-themed fonts (Guede, Ironworks and Veve) to three different Louisiana charities.  Recently their fonts have been prominently featured in the Spiderwick books and film.

The Windlass font was used on the covers of the Percy Jackson book series by Rick Riordan as well as the Percy Jackson and the Olympians film.  

The Folkard font is used for the main heading font in World of Warcraft and also in the Disney Fairies game series. 

The Valdemar font is featured on the covers of all of Mark Chadbourn's fantasy novel series including Age of Misrule.

References

External links
Scriptorium Fonts website
Biography of Scriptorium's Dave Nalle at IdentiFont
Foundry review from Fontacle.com
Early review from the newsletter of the William Morris Society in 1993
Foundry Section on MyFonts
Foundry Section on Fonts.com

Type foundries
1992 establishments in Texas
Design companies established in 1992